Col. James M. Schoonmaker, formerly Willis B. Boyer, is a lake freighter that served as a commercial vessel on the Great Lakes for much of the 20th century.  Named for Medal of Honor recipient James Martinus Schoonmaker, it is currently a museum ship in Toledo, Ohio.

History

The steamship Col. James M. Schoonmaker began life on 1 July 1911 at the Great Lakes Engineering Works in Ecorse, Michigan. At the time of her launch she took the title of Queen of the Lakes which is given to the biggest ship on the Great Lakes. She became the flagship of the Shenango Furnace Company. She broke many cargo records for iron ore, grain and coal in her first year. She was powered by a triple expansion steam engine which was replaced by a steam turbine in 1955. She sailed as part of the Shenango fleet until 1969 when she was sold to the Interlake Steamship Company who chartered Col James M. Schoonmaker to the Republic Steel Corporation. After a three-year charter to that company Interlake decided to sell her to the Cleveland Cliffs Iron Company, who renamed the ship Willis B. Boyer after the company's president. They operated the laker for 7 years in the iron trade until she was laid up in 1980 due to a downturn in the steel industry. After sitting unwanted for 7 years, the city of Toledo decided to purchase her for use as a museum. She sat as the centerpiece of the International Park in that city for several decades before being rechristened back to her original name Col. James M. Schoonmaker and being moved one last time to the site of the National Museum of the Great Lakes on the banks of the Maumee River in Toledo.

Description

Her carrying capacity is 12,200 gross tons at  draft. A unique feature of the ship is inside her pilothouse. She was one of the few ships on the Great Lakes to have twin steering wheels. The starboard is the main wheel while the other was an auxiliary. As the flagship of the company for many years she was fitted with many features a normal laker would not have. She was fitted with 5 luxury guest suites in the bow of the ship. One of the guests was Andrew Carnegie, whose many business interests coincided with the ship's cargoes. She also carried a guest lounge and dining room for the comfort of passengers.

Col. James M. Schoonmaker was one of several dozen vessels based on the influential design of the J. Pierpont Morgan - known as the "600 footers".

Museum ship 
On 17 December 2009 the Toledo-Lucas County Port Authority Board of Directors authorized a Memorandum of Understanding with the Great Lakes Historical Society of Vermilion, Ohio, for the creation of the National Museum of the Great Lakes at the Toledo Maritime Center.
 
Willis B. Boyer was repainted in her Shenango Furnace fleet livery and, on 1 July 2011, rechristened back to her original name, Col. James M. Schoonmaker. In October 2012, Col. James M. Schoonmaker was towed by tugs downriver to her new berth next to the museum.  The museum opened in spring 2014.

See also
 James Martinus Schoonmaker
 SS William G. Mather Maritime Museum The Schoonmaker's sister ship at one time, now a museum ship in Cleveland, Ohio

References

External links
 Col. James M. Schoonmaker Museum Ship

Merchant ships of the United States
Museum ships in Ohio
Museums in Toledo, Ohio
1911 ships
Ships built in Ecorse, Michigan
Queen of the Lakes
Great Lakes freighters
Lake Erie
Toledo, Ohio